Shorty & Doc is an album by trumpeters Shorty Baker and Doc Cheatham recorded in 1961 and originally released on the Swingville label.

Reception

AllMusic awarded the album 4 stars and the review by Scott Yanow stated "The results of this meeting are generally quite friendly rather than combative with Cheatham's Dixielandish phrasing sounding slightly old-fashioned next to Baker. They perform appealing swing-oriented material and sound fine in their many tradeoffs".

Track listing
 "Chitlin's" (Esmond Edwards) – 10:55
 "I Didn't Know What Time It Was" (Richard Rodgers, Lorenz Hart) – 5:13
 "Baker's Dozen" (Shorty Baker) – 4:53
 "Good Queen Bess" (Johnny Hodges) – 7:38
 "Night Train" (Jimmy Forrest) – 6:39
 "Lullabye in Rhythm" (Benny Goodman, Edgar Sampson, Clarence Profit, Walter Hirsch) – 7:35

Personnel 
Shorty Baker, Doc Cheatham – trumpet
Walter Bishop Jr. – piano
Wendell Marshall – bass
J. C. Heard – drums

References 

1961 albums
Doc Cheatham albums
Shorty Baker albums
Swingville Records albums
Albums recorded at Van Gelder Studio
Albums produced by Esmond Edwards